Nicol Julieth Camacho Ariza (Vélez, Santander, 24  October 1999) is a Colombian professional soccer, who plays as midfielder in the Turkish Women's Football Super League for the İzmir-based club Konak Belediyespor. She was a member of the Colombia women's U-20 team.

Personal life 
Camacho first became interested in soccer at the age of eleven. She had to play with boys as there were no teams for girls. Her talent was spotted by Óscar Flórez who was the coach for Club Real Sociedad.

Club career 
She joined the women's team for Atlético Bucaramanga when she was 17 years old.

In October 2022, she moved to Turkey, and joined Konak Belediyespor to playe in the 2022–23 Super League.

International career 
She played for the Colombia women's U-20 team in the 2018 South American U-20 Women's Championship in Ecuador to qualify for the 2019 FIFA Women's World Cup in France.

References 

1999 births
Living people
Sportspeople from Santander Department
Colombian women's footballers
Atlético Bucaramanga footballers
Women's association football midfielders
Colombian expatriate women's footballers
Colombian expatriate sportspeople in Turkey
Expatriate women's footballers in Turkey
Konak Belediyespor players